Eritrea is divided into six regions (zobas) and subdivided into subregions ("sub-zobas"). The geographical extent of the regions is based on their respective hydrological properties. This a dual intent on the part of the Eritrean government: to provide each administration with sufficient control over its agricultural capacity, and to eliminate historical intra-regional conflicts. 

The regions, followed by the subregions, are:

 
Eritrea
Eritrea